Tom Clancy's Ghost Recon: Desert Siege is an expansion of Tom Clancy's Ghost Recon developed by Red Storm Entertainment and published by Ubi Soft for Microsoft Windows. It is also an unlockable campaign in the PlayStation 2 version of Tom Clancy's Ghost Recon.

Plot
In 2009, nearly one year after a war in Russia, old hostilities between Eritrea and Ethiopia have resurfaced. Colonel Tesfaye Wolde of the Ethiopian army had participated in illegal arms trades with Russian ultra-nationalists, who were selling arms at low prices to finance their coup d'état the previous year. Sparing no time at all, Colonel Wolde, with a newly refurbished arsenal, overthrows the Ethiopian government and seizes the opportunity to reclaim Eritrea, which gained its independence in 1993. The situation garners international interest when the conflict threatens shipping lanes in the Red Sea. In response to a plea from the Eritrean government for international support, the United States mobilizes the Ghosts, to stop Colonel Wolde from advancing any further.

The Ghosts arrive in Eritrea, destroying an Ethiopian occupation camp near a beach and retaking control an Eritrean oil refinery that had been captured by the Ethiopian army. The Ghosts then capture a train depot from the Ethiopians, gaining enemy intelligence in the process. They then escort a humanitarian aid convoy. They then push the Ethiopians out of Eritrea and capture one of Wolde's high-ranking lieutenants. Wolde attempts to reinvade Eritrea in a last act of defiance by leading a tank column across the border, but is killed by the Ghosts. The remnants of the Ethiopian army surrenders to the U.S. military, the legitimate government of Ethiopia is restored, and Eritrea is liberated.

Reception

Tom Clancy's Ghost Recon: Desert Siege was met with positive reception upon release; GameRankings gave it a score of 83.17%, while Metacritic gave it 82 out of 100.

References

External links
 

2002 video games
MacOS games
PlayStation 2 games
Red Storm Entertainment games
Single-player video games
Tom Clancy games
Tom Clancy's Ghost Recon games
Ubisoft games
Video game expansion packs
Video games developed in the United States
Video games featuring female protagonists
Video games set in 2009
Video games set in Colorado
Video games set in Ethiopia
Video games set in New York (state)
Video games set in North Carolina
Video games set in Washington (state)
Windows games
de:Tom Clancy’s Ghost Recon#Desert Siege
es:Tom Clancy's Ghost Recon#Ghost Recon: Desert Siege
gl:Tom Clancy's Ghost Recon#Ghost Recon: Desert Siege